RealMagic (or ReelMagic), from Sigma Designs, was one of the first fully compliant MPEG playback boards on the market in the mid-1990s.

RealMagic is a hardware-accelerated MPEG decoder that mixes its video stream into a computer video card's output through the video card's feature connector. It is also a SoundBlaster-compatible sound card.

Successors

Sigma design's Realmagic superseded by
Realmagic Hollywood+
Realmagic XCard
Realmagic NetStream2000 - 4000

Several software companies in 1993 promised to support the card, including Access, Interplay, and Sierra. Software written for RealMagic includes:

Under a Killing Moon - Access Software
Gabriel Knight
Escape from Cybercity
Kings Quest VI - Sierra Online
Dragon's Lair
Police Quest IV - Sierra Online
Return to Zork - Infocom
Lord of the Rings - Interplay Entertainment

Note: the above titles were on a REELMAGIC demo CD that came with the hardware. The CD also contained corporate promotion videos, training videos, news footage of JFK and the Apollo moon mission. Also included in the bundle, was a complete version of The Horde - published by Crystal Dynamics (1994)

Other software includes:
The Psychotron (an interactive mystery movie) - Merit Software

References

Graphics cards